Lubos Kostolani (born ) is a Slovak male volleyball player. He is part of the Slovakia men's national volleyball team. On club level he plays for VKP Bratislava.

References

External links
 profile at FIVB.org

1990 births
Living people
Slovak men's volleyball players
Place of birth missing (living people)